
Year 670 (DCLXX) was a common year starting on Tuesday (link will display the full calendar) of the Julian calendar, the 670th year of the Common Era (CE) and Anno Domini (AD) designations, the 670th year of the 1st millennium, the 70th year of the 7th century, and the 1st year of the 670s decade. The denomination 670 for this year has been used since the early medieval period, when the Anno Domini calendar era became the prevalent method in Europe for naming years.

Events 
 By place 

 Byzantine Empire 
 Arab-Byzantine War:  The Arab fleet dominates the Aegean Sea and conquers the strategic islands, Rhodes, Cos and Chios. The shore on the southern part of Sea of Marmara is taken, providing an excellent base at Cyzicus to begin the blockade of Constantinople by sea.

 Britain 
 February 15 – King Oswiu of Northumbria dies during a pilgrimage to Rome in the company of bishop Wilfrid. He is succeeded by his son Ecgfrith, while his youngest son Ælfwine becomes king of Deira. Oswiu is buried at Whitby Abbey, alongside Edwin of Northumbria.      

 Arabian Empire 
 Muslim Conquest: Arab forces (10,000 men) under general Uqba ibn Nafi invade the Byzantine Exarchate of Africa. He establishes a military base at Kairouan (Tunisia) for further invasions, and founds the Great Mosque, also known as the "Mosque of Uqba".

 Asia 
 Battle of Dafei River: Chinese forces (80,000 men), under general Xue Rengui of the Tang dynasty, are annihilated by the Tibetans, who take over control of the Tarim Basin.
 A Goguryeo restoration movement, led by Geom Mojam in northern Korea, places Anseung on the throne. Geom is later murdered, and Anseung flees to neighboring Silla.
 Tarumanagara (modern Indonesia) is divided into two kingdoms (Sunda Kingdom and Galuh Kingdom), with the Citarum River as the boundary (approximate date).
 A family register, Kogo-nenjaku, is prepared in Japan (approximate date).

 By topic 

 Religion 
 Hōryū-ji, a Japanese Buddhist temple, burns to the ground after being hit by lightning; its reconstruction is immediately begun.
 The diocese of Dorchester-on-Thames in England is replaced by the Diocese of Winchester (approximate date).

Births 
 Bertrada of Prüm, Merovingian princess (approximate date)
 Childebert III, king of the Franks (approximate date)
 Corbinian, Frankish bishop (approximate date)
 Drogo, Carolingian duke of Champagne (d. 708) 
 Petronax, Italian monk and abbot (approximate date)
 Smbat VI, Armenian prince (approximate date)
 Tariq ibn Ziyad, Muslim general (d. 720)
 Tatwine, archbishop of Canterbury (approximate date)
 Tridu Songtsen, emperor of Tibet (d. 704)
 Wihtred, king of Kent (approximate date)

Deaths 
 February 15 – Oswiu, king of Northumbria
 August 18 – Fiacre, Irish hermit 
 Audomar, bishop of Thérouanne (approximate date)
 Geom Mojam, military leader of Goguryeo
 Hasan ibn Ali, grandson of Muhammad and second Shi'a Imam (b. 625)
 Javanshir, king of Caucasian Albania 
 Li Chunfeng, Chinese mathematician and historian (b. 602) 
 Merewalh, king of Magonsæte (approximate date)
 Safiyya bint Huyayy, wife of Muhammad (approximate date)
 Theodard, bishop of Maastricht (approximate date)

References

Sources